Woldemar is a given name, a variant of  Waldemar.

Notable people with the name include:

 Woldemar Bargiel (1828–1897), German composer of classical music
 Woldemar Brinkmann (1890–1959), German architect and interior designer associated with Nazi architecture
 Woldemar Hägglund (1893–1963), Major General Finnish Army in the second world war
 Woldemar Kernig (1840–1917), Russian and Baltic German internist and neurologist, saved many with meningitis
 Woldemar Mobitz (1889–1951), German physician
 Oskar Woldemar Pihl (1890–1959), Russian silversmith, Fabergé workmaster
 Woldemar Voigt (1850–1919), German physicist who taught at the Georg August University of Göttingen
 Woldemar von Daehn (1838–1900), Finnish politician
 Woldemar von Seidlitz (1850–1922), Russian-born German art historian
 Ulrich Frédéric Woldemar, Comte de Lowendal (1700–1755), German-born French soldier and statesmen
 Woldemar, Prince of Lippe (1824–1895), sovereign of the Principality of Lippe from 1875

See also 

 Voldemar
 Waldemar
 Lord Voldemort

Masculine given names